Templeton v Jones [1984] 1 NZLR 448  is a cited case in New Zealand regarding defamation and free speech

References

Court of Appeal of New Zealand cases
Free speech case law
1984 in New Zealand law
1984 in case law
New Zealand tort case law